Hưng Định is a ward of Thuận An town in Bình Dương Province of Southeast region of Vietnam.

References

Populated places in Bình Dương province